Pterostylis rufa, commonly known as the red rustyhood is a plant in the orchid family Orchidaceae and is endemic to south-eastern Australia. It has a rosette of leaves and up to fifteen bright reddish-brown flowers with translucent white "windows" and a  dark brown, insect-like labellum.  It occurs from southern Queensland to south-eastern South Australia.

Description
Pterostylis rufa is a terrestrial,  perennial, deciduous, herb with an underground tuber. The "head" end is thickened, has many short white hairs and there are between four or five longer hairs on each side of the "body". Flowering occurs from September to November.

Taxonomy and naming
Pterostylis rufa was first formally described in 1810 by Robert Brown and the description was published in Prodromus Florae Novae Hollandiae et Insulae Van Diemen. The specific epithet (rufa) is a Latin word meaning "red" or "reddish".

Distribution and habitat
The red rustyhood widespread and locally common, growing in heathy woodland and open forest, often in shallow soil in rocky places. It occurs from the Darling Downs through eastern New South Wales, in scattered populations across Victoria and rarely in far south-eastern South Australia.

Ecology
Flowers of P. rufa are pollinated by fungus gnats of the species Orfelia.

References

rufa
Endemic orchids of Australia
Orchids of New South Wales
Orchids of Queensland
Orchids of South Australia
Orchids of Victoria (Australia)
Plants described in 1810